Namoi, known as The Namoi until 1910 was an electoral district of the Legislative Assembly in the Australian state of New South Wales, created in 1880 and named after the Namoi River. It elected two members between 1891 and 1894. In 1894 it was abolished and partly replaced by Narrabri. In 1904, with the downsizing of the Legislative Assembly after Federation, Namoi was recreated, replacing Narrabri and part of Gunnedah. Between 1920 and 1927, it largely absorbed Gwydir and Tamworth and elected three members under proportional representation. In 1927, it was replaced by single-member electorates, mainly Namoi, Tamworth and Barwon. Namoi was abolished in 1950.

Members for Namoi

Election results

References

Former electoral districts of New South Wales
1880 establishments in Australia
Constituencies established in 1880
1894 disestablishments in Australia
Constituencies disestablished in 1894
1904 establishments in Australia
Constituencies established in 1904
1950 disestablishments in Australia
Constituencies disestablished in 1950